Aloinopsis is a genus of ice plants from South Africa.

Description
This genus is closely related to the similar Titanopsis, Deilanthe and Nananthus genera. Aloinopsis species have a rather large tuberous root system, and are occasionally cultivated for their looks.  They also tend to grow more "heads" when they are raised. Most Aloinopsis are winter growers and can react badly to too much water at the wrong time. Aloinopsis malherbei reportedly have "blunt tips to their leaves, which are densely covered with prominent white tubercles."

Distribution

The species of Aloinopsis are indigenous to an arid area stretching across the border between the Western, Eastern and Northern Cape provinces of South Africa. Most species occur in an arid winter-rainfall area. An outlying species occurs in the far north eastern corner of the Northern Cape.

Species and varieties of Aloinopsis
 Aloinopsis luckhoffii
 Aloinopsis malherbei (Giant jewel plant)
 Aloinopsis meridionalis
 Aloinopsis peersii
 Aloinopsis orpenii
 Aloinopsis rosulata
 Aloinopsis rubrolineata
 Aloinopsis schooneesii
 Aloinopsis schwant
 Aloinopsis setifera
 Aloinopsis aloides (synonym of Nananthus aloides)
 Aloinopsis hilmarii (synonym of Deilanthe hilmarii)
 Aloinopsis spathulata Aloinopsis thudichumii Aloinopsis vittata (synonym of Nananthus vittatus)
 Aloinopsis villetii''

References

 
Flora of the Cape Provinces
Aizoaceae genera